Yoann Salmier (born 21 November 1992) is a professional footballer who plays as a centre-back for Ligue 1 club Troyes. Born in metropolitan France, he represents French Guiana at international level.

Club career
After having spent the 2018–19 season at Troyes on loan from Strasbourg, Troyes signed him permanently on a three-year deal in June 2019.

International career
Salmier made his debut for the French Guiana national team in a 2–1 2017 Caribbean Cup qualification loss to the Dominican Republic on 7 June 2016.

References

1992 births
Living people
Association football defenders
French Guianan footballers
French Guiana international footballers
French footballers
French people of French Guianan descent
Ligue 1 players
Ligue 2 players
Championnat National players
RC Strasbourg Alsace players
ES Troyes AC players